Alfornelos station is part of the Blue Line of the Lisbon Metro and is located in the Alfornelos neighbourhood of Amadora.

History
The station opened on 15 May 2004 in conjunction with the Amadora Este station. It is located on Praça Teófilo Braga.

The architectural design of the station is by Alberto Barradas.

Connections

Suburban buses

Vimeca / Lisboa Transportes 
 128 Casal da Mira (Dolce Vita Tejo) ↔ Lisboa (Colégio Militar) 
 143 Amadora (Estação Norte) ↔ Pontinha (Estação)
 155 Amadora (Hospital) - Circulação

See also
 List of Lisbon metro stations

References

External links

Blue Line (Lisbon Metro) stations
Railway stations opened in 2004